The Bournemouth East and Christchurch by-election of 6 February 1952 was held after Conservative Member of Parliament (MP) Brendan Bracken was elevated to the House of Lords. The seat was retained by the Conservatives.

Results

References

Bournemouth East and Christchurch by-election
Bournemouth East and Christchurch by-election
Bournemouth East and Christchurch by-election, 1952
By-elections to the Parliament of the United Kingdom in South West England constituencies
Politics of Bournemouth
Politics of Christchurch, Dorset
Bournemouth East and Christchurch by-election